The Qatar national under-17 football team is the national U-17 team of Qatar and is controlled by the Qatar Football Association.

History
Despite being a country with a small base of footballers; Qatar has a respectable amount of achievements at the youth level. In addition to becoming champions of Asia in 1990 after winning the 1990 AFC U-16 Championship held in the UAE, they also finished runners up five times (1985, 1986, 1992, 1994, and 1998). In addition, Qatar were the hosts of four of the U-16 championships; a record.

The youth players became consistent finalists in the Asian U-16 championships since they first reached the final in 1986 when they lost to South Korea in a dramatic penalty shoot-out on home soil, which was tightly clinched 5–4. This was followed by another appearance in 1988 before winning it 1990 after defeating China by a scoreline of 2–0.

One year later, they managed an Asian record high fourth-place finish in the FIFA U-17 World Cup, even with a relatively slow start as they failed to gain more than a single point in the first two group B matches, however, a Jassim Al Tammimi goal against Australia was enough for a quarterfinal place.

Qatar advanced to the semis on the expense of the United States, whom they defeated 5–4 in a penalty shoot-out after the score had settled 1–1 at the end of regulation time. Shortly after, they themselves went down in a penalty shootout to eventual champions, Ghana, in the semi-finals, before suffering the same fate against Argentina in the third-place match respectively.

Qatar's tradition of youth teams' excellence was to be prolonged for another decade; they reached the World Cup three more times on 1993, 1995 and 2005.

In the 2005 FIFA U-17 World Cup, Qatar were drawn 2–2 with the mighty Netherlands before half-time in their first group match. Although Qatar went on to lose the match 5–3, many future talents were discovered during the tournament, including Khalfan Ibrahim who went on to win the Asian Player of the Year award one year later.

AFC U-17 Asian Cup record

 Red border color indicates tournament was held on home soil.

FIFA U-17 World Cup record

Current squad
Squad for 2012 AFC U-16 Championship qualification on 22 September 2011 (link)
Head coach:  Óscar Fernández

|-----
! colspan="9" bgcolor="#B0D3FB" align="left" |
|-----

                              
|-----
! colspan="9" bgcolor="#B0D3FB" align="left" |
|-----

|-----
! colspan="9" bgcolor="#B0D3FB" align="left" |
|-----

Current coaching staff
Last update: February 2014.

Managerial history

 Ronald de Carvalho (1979–85)
 Cabralzinho (1985)
 José Roberto Avila (ca. 1991)
 Humberto Filho (1993)
 Wiel Coerver (ca. 1993)
 Bo Augustsson (ca. 1990s)
 René Meulensteen (ca. 1990s)
 Dave Mackay (1995)
 Eid Mubarak (1995–96)
 Ahmed Omar (1996)
 Ove Pedersen (1996–97)
 José Paulo (1998–99)
 Saeed Al-Misnad (1999)
 José Paulo (1999–c. 00)
 Chris Dekker (2000–01)
 Ruud Dokter (2001–02)
 Patrick Revelli (2002–04)
 Tom Saintfiet (2004)
 Tini Ruijs (2004–05)
 Fahad Thani (2005–06)
 Tini Ruijs (2010–12)
 Félix Sánchez Bas (2012–13)
 Óscar Fernández (2013–)

See also
Qatar national football team
Qatar national under-20 football team
Qatar national under-23 football team

References

External links
Qatar Football Association - official site
Qatar Football Association - U-17

National youth sports teams of Qatar
Asian national under-17 association football teams